Alkira House is a historic building in Melbourne, Australia. It is widely regarded as one of Melbourne’s most stunning examples of Art Deco architecture. Built in 1936 by architect, James Wardrop, Alkira House is located at 18 Queen Street.

James Wardrop is also the architect responsible for designing the Shrine of Remembrance.  One of the most striking features of the building is the use of  Glazed architectural terra-cotta and glass brick.  It was, in fact, the first building in Australia to use glass bricks in its construction.  Cleverly designed, the black and white vertical terracotta tiles on the façade take the eye on a journey over six levels to the 'empire-state-like' steeple on top, forming an architectural spine through the centre of the building.

Alkira House is listed on the Victorian Heritage Register and has at least one apartment available for short term stays on the 2nd floor at Apartment Alkira.

References

External links
 https://web.archive.org/web/20090916070642/http://apartmentalkira.com.au/

Art Deco architecture in Melbourne
Heritage-listed buildings in Melbourne
1936 establishments in Australia
Buildings and structures in Melbourne City Centre
Buildings and structures completed in 1936